The Indian motorcycle Grand Prix is a planned motorcycle race due to form part of MotoGP from 2023 at the Buddh International Circuit in Greater Noida, Uttar Pradesh, India.

Previously, the Buddh International Circuit was supposed to host a round of the 2013 Superbike World Championship. However, that race was cancelled due to operational charges of the circuit.

Circuit 

The race will be held at the Buddh International Circuit in Greater Noida near New Delhi from 2023. The  circuit was designed by German architect Hermann Tilke. Four million cubic tons of earth were moved to achieve the rise and fall through the lap.

References

Motorcycle Grands Prix
motorcycle Grand Prix
Grand Prix